Série 2500 were the first 15 electric locomotives built for the Portuguese Railways (CP). They entered service in 1956, for the newly electrified 25 kV line running north from Lisbon. They had a maximum speed of 120 km/h. They were withdrawn from service in 2009; all but one have been sold for scrap.

References

Electric locomotives of Portugal
Railway locomotives introduced in 1956
Bo′Bo′ locomotives
Alstom locomotives
Henschel locomotives
5 ft 6 in gauge locomotives
50 c/s Group locomotives